Standard Chartered Tanzania, whose official name is Standard Chartered Bank Tanzania Limited, but is often referred to as Stanchart Tanzania, is a commercial bank in Tanzania, and is a wholly owned subsidiary of Standard Chartered. It is one of the banks licensed by the Bank of Tanzania, the national banking regulator.

The bank serves retail customers, corporate customer, and medium to large business enterprises. , it was the fifth-largest commercial bank in Tanzania, by assets, with an estimated asset base of US$793.1 million (TZS:1.24 trillion).

History
The bank was established in 1911. In 1967 its assets were nationalized, but was returned to its current owners in 1992. Stanchart Tanzania focuses on the following banking sectors: (a) agriculture (b) trading and (c) manufacturing. It also maintains a department solely devoted to small-to-medium enterprises (SMEs).

Ownership
Stanchart Tanzania is a subsidiary of the Standard Chartered Bank Group, an International financial services conglomerate, headquartered in London in the United Kingdom, with operations in more than seventy countries and a network of over 1,700 branches, employing in excess of 73,000 people.
The stock of the Standard Chartered Bank Group is listed on the London Stock Exchange, the National Stock Exchange of India and the Hong Kong Stock Exchange.

Branch Network
, Standard Chartered Bank Tanzania operates a network of seven (7) branches, in the following locations and controls a network of eight (8) Automated Teller Machines (ATMs):

 Main Branch - International House Building, Shaaban Robert Street at Garden Avenue, Dar es Salaam
 NIC Branch - NIC Life House Building, Sokoine Drive at Ohio Street, Dar es Salaam
 Shoppers Plaza Branch - Shoppers Plaza Building, Mikocheni, Old Bagamoyo Road, Dar es Salaam
 Kariakoo Branch - Narung’ombe Street, Kariakoo, Dar es Salaam
 Mwanza Branch - Chama Cha Mapinduzi Building, Makongoro Road, Mwanza
 Moshi Branch - 98 Rindi Lane Road, Moshi
 Arusha Branch - Sykes Building, Goliondo Road, Arusha

See also 
 List of banks in Tanzania
 List of banks in Africa
 Bank of Tanzania
 Standard Chartered Bank
 Standard Chartered Kenya
 Standard Chartered Uganda
 Standard Chartered Zambia
 Standard Chartered Zimbabwe
 Economy of Tanzania

References 

Banks of Tanzania
Companies of Tanzania
Economy of Dar es Salaam
Banks established in 1911